Goubangzi railway station is a third-class train station located in the town of Goubangzi, Beizhen, Jinzhou, Liaoning, China on the Beijing–Harbin railway. It was built in 1899, and it is under the jurisdiction of China Railway Shenyang Group.

References

Stations on the Beijing–Harbin Railway
Railway stations in Liaoning